Krippner is a surname. Notable people with the surname include:

 Janine Krippner, physical volcanologist from New Zealand
 Martin Krippner (1817–1894), Bohemian-born Austrian settler of New Zealand
 Ronny Krippner, German-born British organist, conductor, teacher, and composer
 Stanley Krippner (born 1932), American psychologist and parapsychologist